USS Yew (YN-32/AN-37) was an  built for the United States Navy during World War II. She was later transferred to the French Navy as Scorpion (A728). She was sold to Malaysian owners but sank while under tow from the former French ship  when that ship struck a reef off Cikobia Island, Fiji, on 30 July 1978 and also sank.

Career 
Yew (YN-37) was laid down on 22 May 1941 at Camden, New Jersey, by John H. Mathis & Company; launched on 4 October 1941; sponsored by Miss Alice E. Morgan, daughter of Comdr. A. L. Morgan, USN (Ret.); and placed in service on 1 July 1942.
 
Records for Yew's service are practically nonexistent. The fragmentary evidence available shows that the ship was reclassified AN-37 on 1 January 1944. The net tender was ultimately decommissioned at Oran, Algeria, on 30 November 1944 and simultaneously transferred to the French Navy under lend-lease.

She served as Scorpion (A728) until she was nominally returned by the French on 21 March 1949 but was sold outright to the French on the same day. Her American name, Yew, was struck from the Navy List on 28 April 1949.
 
Scorpion served the French Navy into the mid-1970s before she was sunk at Cikobia Island, Fiji, 30 July 1978.

References
 
 NavSource Online: Service Ship Photo Archive – YN-32 / AN-37 Yew

Aloe-class net laying ships
Ships built by John H. Mathis & Company
1941 ships
World War II net laying ships of the United States
Aloe-class net laying ships of the French Navy
World War II auxiliary ships of France